Kępina may refer to the following places:
Kępina, Białobrzegi County in Masovian Voivodeship (east-central Poland)
Kępina, Grójec County in Masovian Voivodeship (east-central Poland)
Kępina, Płock County in Masovian Voivodeship (east-central Poland)
Kępina, Greater Poland Voivodeship (west-central Poland)
Kępina, Pomeranian Voivodeship (north Poland)